Glen's Markets was an American supermarket chain founded in Gaylord, Michigan in 1951. The chain had over 20 stores throughout northern Michigan at its peak. It was a subsidiary of SpartanNash, who converted most of the chain's locations to its Family Fare banner between 2010 and 2014.

History
The first Glen's Market was opened in 1951 in Gaylord, Michigan by Glen Catt, in a store originally known as Vincent's. The store was expanded later in the 1950s, just as Glen's became affiliated Spartan Foods (now SpartanNash). Stores in Kalkaska and Grayling opened in 1956 and 1959. Throughout the 1970s, the original three stores were relocated to new buildings, while many more were added throughout northeastern Michigan. The locations in Rose City and Mio were both converted from IGA, while Mancelona and Roscommon were both converted from The Great Atlantic & Pacific Tea Company (A&P). By 1981, Glen's operated 11 stores, with a 12th under construction at the time in Rogers City. The chain expanded into the Upper Peninsula in 1986 by purchasing Red Owl locations in St. Ignace, Munising, Sault Ste. Marie, and Iron Mountain, along with a newly built store in Escanaba. The latter two were sold only two years later, while both Munising and Sault Ste. Marie were relocated in the early 1990s. In 1992, Glen's acquired former Giantway locations in Petoskey, East Tawas, and Alpena, followed by a second Petoskey location in a former Buy Low Foods a year later. The East Tawas store, along with an existing store in Alpena that opened in 1988, were both closed and converted to Save-A-Lot in 1997. The same year, the Gaylord store was thoroughly remodeled, adding a Dairy Queen franchise.

Spartan Stores, now known as SpartanNash, bought Glen's in 1999. At the time of the sale, the chain was owned by Glen Catt's grandson, also named Glen Catt, and it comprised 23 stores, 4 pharmacies, and a warehouse in Waters, Michigan. Not included in the sale were several other properties still owned by the company at the time, including the Save-A-Lot franchises, and the shopping center adjacent to the Gaylord store. Under Spartan's ownership, the Glen's name was expanded in 2004 when Spartan consolidated most locations of Traverse City-based Prevo's and all locations of Harrison-based Ashcraft's into Glen's. In 2012, the Glen's stores in Clare and Marion, both former Ashcraft's, were converted to a new discount brand called Valu Land.

At this point, Spartan also began rebranding Glen's stores to Family Fare. The first to change over was the Midland store, also a former Ashcraft's, in 2010. Throughout 2013 and 2014, Glen's locations increasingly converted to Family Fare, ending with Frankfort and Sault Ste. Marie. The only exceptions were the two locations in Petoskey, where one Glen's store was closed while the other was instead rebranded by Spartan as D&W Fresh Market.

References

External links
Catt Development

Retail companies established in 1951
Retail companies disestablished in 2014
1951 establishments in Michigan
Defunct companies based in Michigan
Defunct supermarkets of the United States
2014 disestablishments in Michigan